La Femme Musketeer is a made for television movie produced by Hallmark Entertainment and Larry Levinson Productions, filmed on Draguć in Croatia.  It originally premiered on June 20, 2004 on Hallmark Channel.

Plot summary
The legend of D'Artagnan (Michael York) gets a gender-bending update in this swashbuckling adventure. Though legendary swordsman Jacques D'Artagnan's best days may be well behind him, he has schooled his daughter Valentine (Susie Amy) well in the way of the sword. Now it's time for Valentine to strike out on her own. With her father's sword and a letter of introduction to Commander Finot (Roy Dotrice), the eager young novice sets out to seek her fortune in Paris. Though a woman has never before been appointed the rank of swordsman, Valentine is determined to prove her worth by taking on a deadly mission to rescue the bride-to-be of King Louis XIV from a band of fearsome kidnappers, teaming with the three sons of the legendary Three Musketeers who rode with her father.

Cast
 Michael York as Jacques D'Artagnan (York had played Dumas' D'Artagnan in three previous films: The Three Musketeers, The Four Musketeers and The Return of the Musketeers}
 Nastassja Kinski as Lady Bolton
 Susie Amy as Valentine D'Artagnan
 John Rhys-Davies as Porthos
 Gérard Depardieu as Cardinal Mazarin
 Kristina Krepela as Maria Theresa of Spain
Freddie Sayers as King Louis
 Clemency Burton-Hill as Marie Mancini
Marcus Jean Pirae as Villeroi
 Constantine Gregory as Planchet
Andrew Musselman as Antoine Porthos
 Christopher Cazenove as Athos
 Casper Zafer as Gaston Athos
 Allan Corduner as Aramis
 Niko Nicotera as Etienne Aramis
 Zrinka Cvitešić as Elena
 Nick Brimble as The General
 Luka Peroš as Funeral Musketeer
 Nicholas Rowe as Duke of Buckingham
 Roy Dotrice as Commander Finot (Uncredited)

See also
 The Three Musketeers, 1844 novel by Alexander Dumas

External links
 
 La Femme Musketeer at Hallmark Movie Channel
 

2004 television films
2004 films
2000s historical adventure films
American swashbuckler films
Hallmark Channel original films
Films based on Twenty Years After
Films directed by Steve Boyum
Cultural depictions of Louis XIV
Cultural depictions of Cardinal Mazarin
Films shot in Croatia
Television shows based on works by Alexandre Dumas
2000s American films